Mangafan is a Hungarian manga publisher, located in Szigetszentmiklós near Budapest, Hungary. It was founded in 2006. Since May, 2007, they also publish a monthly magazine dealing with manga, anime and Japanese culture, called Mondo.

Published manga
Naruto 1-28
Rurouni Kenshin 1-16
Love Com 1-14

Finished manga/manhwa publish
ALIVE
Blade of the Phantom Master (+ Gaiden)
Chrono Crusade
Darker than Black
Death Note
Hellsing
Nana (hiatus)
Shirahime-Syo: Snow Goddess Tales
Vampire Knight

Published anime DVD
Fullmetal Alchemist 1 (ep. 1–4)
Fullmetal Alchemist 2 (ep. 5–8)
Fullmetal Alchemist 3 (ep. 9–12)
Fullmetal Alchemist 4 (ep. 13–16)
Fullmetal Alchemist 5 (ep. 17–20)
Death Note 1 (ep. 1–4)
Death Note 2 (ep. 5–8)
Death Note 3 (ep. 9–12)
Death Note 4 (ep. 13–16)
Death Note 5 (ep. 17–20)
Death Note 6 (ep. 21–24)
Death Note 7 (ep. 25–28)
Bleach 1 (ep. 1–4)
Bleach 2 (ep. 5–8)
Bleach 3 (ep. 9–12)
Bleach 4 (ep. 13–16)
Bleach 5 (ep. 17–20)
Kyorochan 1 (ep. 1–12)
Death Note box (ep. 1-20)
Death Note box 2 (ep. 21–37)
Bleach box (ep. 1-20)
Bleach box 2 (ep. 21–41)

External links 
 Mangafan website
 Mondo magazine website

Publishing companies established in 2006
Manga distributors
Manhwa distributors
Publishing companies of Hungary
Mass media in Szigetszentmiklós